A list of lighthouses in the Netherlands.

Active lighthouses

Deactivated lighthouses

Demolished

See also
 Lists of lighthouses and lightvessels
 List of lighthouses in Friesland

External links

 

 
Lighthouses